Birmingham Country Club, located in Birmingham, Alabama, was founded in 1898 as the Country Club of Birmingham. It moved in 1900 from North Birmingham to Lakeview, then again in 1926 to a site in Shades Valley, now within the city of Mountain Brook. The Lakeview club hosted former president Theodore Roosevelt and several Women's Southern Golf Association tournaments. The present site features two 18-hole courses designed in the 1920s by Donald Ross.

References 
 Satterfield, Carolyn Green (March 16, 2009) "Country Club of Birmingham." Encyclopedia of Alabama - accessed April 5, 2009

External links 
 Country Club of Birmingham website
 Rick Shiels is a former professional golfer

Golf clubs and courses in Alabama
Sports venues in Birmingham, Alabama
1926 establishments in Alabama